Statistics of Empress's Cup in the 2005 season.

Overview
It was contested by 32 teams, and Nippon TV Beleza won the championship.

Results

1st round
Nippon TV Beleza 7-0 Kamimura Gakuen High School
Seiwa Gakuen High School 0-2 Waseda University
INAC Leonessa 10-0 Hokkaido Bunkyo University Meisei High School
Hinomoto Gakuen High School 1-1 (pen 5-3) Takarazuka Bunnys
Urawa Reds 13-0 Toyama Ladies SC
Iga FC Fraulein 0-3 AS Elfen Sayama FC
JEF United Chiba 3-0 Hiroshima Fujita SC
Musashigaoka College 0-1 TEPCO Mareeze
Iga FC Kunoichi 3-2 Tokiwagi Gakuken High School
Nagoya FC 2-1 Shimizudaihachi SC
Ohara Gakuen JaSRA 1-0 Fukuoka Jogakuin FC Anclas
Urawa Motobuto 0-3 Okayama Yunogo Belle
Speranza FC Takatsuki 1-0 Osaka University of Health and Sport Sciences
Kanagawa University 1-5 Albirex Niigata
Renaissance Kumamoto FC 1-2 Kibi International University
Kochi JFC Rosa 0-8 Tasaki Perule FC

2nd round
Nippon TV Beleza 5-0 Waseda University
INAC Leonessa 6-0 Hinomoto Gakuen High School
Urawa Reds 5-0 AS Elfen Sayama FC
JEF United Chiba 0-4 TEPCO Mareeze
Iga FC Kunoichi 4-0 Nagoya FC
Ohara Gakuen JaSRA 0-2 Okayama Yunogo Belle
Speranza FC Takatsuki 3-0 Albirex Niigata
Kibi International University 0-8 Tasaki Perule FC

Quarterfinals
Nippon TV Beleza 8-0 INAC Leonessa
Urawa Reds 1-0 TEPCO Mareeze
Iga FC Kunoichi 1-4 Okayama Yunogo Belle
Speranza FC Takatsuki 2-3 Tasaki Perule FC

Semifinals
Nippon TV Beleza 2-0 Urawa Reds
Okayama Yunogo Belle 0-4 Tasaki Perule FC

Final
Nippon TV Beleza 4-1 Tasaki Perule FC
Nippon TV Beleza won the championship.

References

Empress's Cup
2005 in Japanese women's football